The Yazidi Academy is a non-profit organisation and learned society based in Hanover, Germany.

The organisation was founded in 2009, it concerns itself with the historical and current situation of the Yazidis. Since then, it has also published the German-language magazine Zeitschrift der Ezidischen Akademie. Forum für Diskussionsbeiträge zum Ezidentum. It also hosts the Yazidi Library that had been established in 2007.

The Yazidi Academy is a member of the network of migrants initiatives MiSO. It offers literacy and German courses as well as legal counselling for asylum seekers.

See also 
Yezidi National Union ULE
Yazidis in Germany
Nineveh Plain
List of Yazidi organizations

References

External links

  

2009 establishments in Germany
Learned societies of Germany
Non-profit organisations based in Lower Saxony
Yazidis in Germany
Yazidi organizations